Woodhenge is a Neolithic Class II henge and timber circle monument within the Stonehenge World Heritage Site in Wiltshire, England.

Discovery
Woodhenge was believed to be identified from an aerial photograph taken by Squadron Leader (later group captain) Gilbert Insall, VC, in 1926, during the same period that an aerial archaeology survey of Wessex by Alexander Keiller and OGS Crawford (Archaeology Officer for the Ordnance Survey) was being undertaken. Although some sources attribute the identification of the henge to Crawford, Che credits the discovery to Insall. 

In fact, the site had been previously found in the early 19th century, when it was described as an earthwork and thought to be a disc barrow. It was originally called "Dough Cover". A professional excavation of the site was undertaken between 1926 and 1929 by Maud Cunnington and B.H. Cunnington. They confirmed that it was a henge.

Date
Pottery from the excavation was identified as being consistent with the grooved ware style of the middle Neolithic, although later beaker sherds were also found.  Thus, the structure was probably built during the period of cultural similarities commonly known as the Beaker. The Bell Beaker culture spans both the Late Neolithic and Britain's early Bronze Age and includes both the distinctive "bell beaker" type ceramic vessels for which the cultural grouping is known, and other local styles of pottery from the Late Neolithic and Early Bronze Age.

While construction of the timber monument was probably earlier, the ditch has been dated to between 2470 and 2000 BC, which would be about the same time as, or slightly later than, construction of the stone circle at Stonehenge. Radiocarbon dating of artefacts shows that the site was still in use around 1800 BC.

Structure

At the centre of the rings was a crouched inhumation of a child which Cunnington interpreted as a dedicatory sacrifice, its skull having been split.  Subsequent theories have indicated that the weight and pressure of the soil over the years could have caused the skull to fragment. After excavation, the remains were taken to London, where they were destroyed during The Blitz, making further examination impossible. Cunnington also found a crouched inhumation of a teenager within a grave dug in the eastern section of the ditch, opposite the entrance.

Most of the 168 post holes held wooden posts, although Cunnington found evidence that a pair of standing stones may have been placed between the second and third post hole rings. Excavations in 2006 indicated that there were at least five standing stones on the site, arranged in a "cove". Those posts would have weighed up to 5 tons, and their arrangement was similar to that of the bluestones at Stonehenge. The positions of the postholes are currently marked with modern concrete posts – a simple and informative method of displaying the site.

Further comparisons with Stonehenge were quickly noticed by Cunnington: both have entrances oriented approximately to the midsummer sunrise, and the diameters of the timber circles at Woodhenge and the stone circles at Stonehenge are similar.

Relationship with other monuments

Over 40 years after the discovery of Woodhenge, another timber circle of comparable size was discovered in 1966,  to the north. Known as the Southern Circle, it lies inside what came to be known as the Durrington Walls henge enclosure.

There are various theories about possible timber structures that might have stood on and about the site, and their purpose, but it is likely that the timbers were free-standing, rather than part of a roofed structure. For many years, the study of Stonehenge had overshadowed work on the understanding of Woodhenge. Recent ongoing investigations as part of the Stonehenge Riverside Project are now starting to cast new light on the site and on its relationship with neighbouring sites and Stonehenge.

Theories have emerged in which the sites may all be part of a layout in which the structures were linked by roads, and which incorporated the natural features of the River Avon. One of these paths, consisting of a series of wide parallel banks and ditches referred to as Stonehenge Avenue, crosses the ridge between the two sites that would otherwise make them both visible from one another, possibly connecting them physically as well as spiritually.

One suggestion is that the use of wood rather than stone may have held a special significance in the beliefs and practices involving the transformation between life and death, possibly separating the two sites into separate "domains". These theories have been supported by findings of bones of butchered pigs exclusively at Woodhenge, showing evidence of feasting, leaving Stonehenge as a site only inhabited by ancestral spirits, not living people. These same possible representations have also been seen in ritualistic megalithic sites on the island of Madagascar, at least 4,000 years after the erection of Woodhenge.

See also
List of archaeoastronomical sites by country
Cuckoo Stone, a standing stone 500 metres to the west
Avebury Henge
Bluestonehenge
Stonehenge

References

External links

 Woodhenge – English Heritage

English Heritage sites in Wiltshire
History of Wiltshire
Stone Age sites in England
Archaeological sites in Wiltshire
Henges
Sites associated with Stonehenge